Simona Halep was the defending champion, but she retired in the second round against Annika Beck.
Qualifier CoCo Vandeweghe won her maiden WTA title, defeating Zheng Jie in the final, 6–2, 6–4.

Seeds

Draw

Finals

Top half

Bottom half

Qualifying

Seeds

Qualifiers

Draw

First qualifier

Second qualifier

Third qualifier

Fourth qualifier

References
 Main draw
 Qualifying draw

Topshelf Openandnbsp;- Singles
2014 Women's Singles